Sir Robert Bell (1589 – 1639) was an English landowner and politician who sat in England's House of Commons in 1626.

Bell was the son of Sir Edmund Bell of Beaupré Hall, Outwell, Norfolk. He matriculated from King's College, Cambridge at Easter 1606, and was knighted in 1611. In 1626, he was elected Member of Parliament for Norfolk.

Bell died at the age of about 50 and was buried at Outwell on 31 October 1639.

References

1589 births
1639 deaths
17th-century English landowners
English MPs 1626
Alumni of King's College, Cambridge
People from Outwell
Members of the Parliament of England for Norfolk